Martinsville, also known as the Indianapolis and Vincennes Railroad Depot, is a historic train station located at Martinsville, Morgan County, Indiana.  It was built by the Indianapolis and Vincennes Railroad in 1911, and is a one-story, rectangular, Bungalow/American Craftsman style brick building.  It has a bellcast red clay tile hipped roof and measures 24 feet by 75 feet.  Passenger service on the line ended in 1940, and the building was subsequently used as a freight depot.  The building faces the Martinsville Sanitarium. The building housed the Martinsville Chamber of Commerce and currently houses the Martinsville Arts Council.

It has been listed on the National Register of Historic Places in 1991 (#91000268) as the Martinsville Vandalia Depot.

References

http://www.nationalregisterofhistoricplaces.com/in/morgan/state.html

Railway stations on the National Register of Historic Places in Indiana
Bungalow architecture in Indiana
Railway stations in the United States opened in 1911
National Register of Historic Places in Morgan County, Indiana
Former Pennsylvania Railroad stations
Transportation buildings and structures in Morgan County, Indiana
Former railway stations in Indiana